Edwards Mountain is located in the Lewis Range, Glacier National Park in the U.S. state of Montana. Edwards Mountain rises just to the west of Sperry Glacier. Based on the Köppen climate classification, Edwards Mountain has an alpine climate characterized by long, usually very cold winters, and short, cool to mild summers. Temperatures can drop below −10 °F with wind chill factors below −30 °F.

Geology

Like other mountains in Glacier National Park, Edwards Mountain is composed of sedimentary rock laid down during the Precambrian to Jurassic periods.

See also
 Mountains and mountain ranges of Glacier National Park (U.S.)
 Geology of the Rocky Mountains

References

Mountains of Flathead County, Montana
Edwards
Lewis Range
Mountains of Montana